Advitya, is a non-profit organization in India that works for providing a better lifestyle for disabled adults. It was established in the year 2000. Their main aim is to create awareness about the disabled adults and increase their levels of socialization. It was established by Mrs. Anjali Shah who is also the founder trustee.

History

In 2000, Anjali Shah started helping and guiding disabled individuals through the healing touch of music and colors. This was how Advitya began.

Area of work

Advitya’s main challenge lies in the fact that they accept students who can no longer continue in other special schools. Since most of the students suffer from major behavioral disorders or are too old, the volunteers at the centre make use of colors and music as therapeutic ways of helping them overcome their problem. They are provided constructive occupation of adding value to a range of gift items like bags, envelopes, purses, stationery, upholstery and their likes.

Events and tie ups

In the past, Advitya has had associations with corporates like GlaxoSmithKline, Asian Paints, Air India, ONGC and Computer Associates.

Advitya has also actively been a part of various student activity programs where students from Dhirubhai Ambani International School and American School of Bombay come for their community service.

It has regularly been a part of Kala Ghoda festivals, Concern India Mela and other prominent exhibitions.

Fest-o-Advitya 2008 was a star-studded event that attracted a lot of media coverage and gave an opportunity to these disabled adults to showcase their talents.

References

 https://web.archive.org/web/20110717152909/http://business.outlookindia.com/article.aspx?266398
 http://www.karmayog.org/nonprofits/npocitylocationdisplay.asp?r=218&loc=Santacruz%20(W)&cityloc=Mumbai

External links
 http://www.advitya.com/

Disability organisations based in India
Organisations based in Mumbai
2000 establishments in Maharashtra
Organizations established in 2000